Anaphora may refer to:
 Anaphora (rhetoric), a rhetorical device
 Anaphora (linguistics), a referential pattern in linguistics
 Anaphora (liturgy), a part of the Eucharistic liturgy in Christianity

See also
 Anaphoric macro
 Anaphoric reference
 Anaphoric pronoun